This table shows an overview of the protected heritage sites in the province of  Walloon Brabant, alphabetically ordered by town name. This list is part of Belgium's national heritage.

List of protected heritage sites, in Beauvechain
List of protected heritage sites, in Braine-l'Alleud
List of protected heritage sites, in Braine-le-Château
List of protected heritage sites, in Chastre
List of protected heritage sites, in Chaumont-Gistoux
List of protected heritage sites, in Court-Saint-Étienne
List of protected heritage sites, in Genappe
List of protected heritage sites, in Grez-Doiceau
List of protected heritage sites, in Hélécine
List of protected heritage sites, in Incourt, Belgium
List of protected heritage sites, in Ittre
List of protected heritage sites, in Jodoigne
List of protected heritage sites, in La Hulpe
List of protected heritage sites, in Lasne

List of protected heritage sites, in Mont-Saint-Guibert
List of protected heritage sites, in Nivelles
List of protected heritage sites, in Orp-Jauche
List of protected heritage sites, in Ottignies-Louvain-la-Neuve
List of protected heritage sites, in Perwez
List of protected heritage sites, in Ramillies, Belgium
List of protected heritage sites, in Rebecq
List of protected heritage sites, in Rixensart
List of protected heritage sites, in Tubize
List of protected heritage sites, in Villers-la-Ville
List of protected heritage sites, in Walhain
List of protected heritage sites, in Waterloo, Belgium
List of protected heritage sites, in Wavre

 
 *Walloon Brabant